Postia is a genus of brown rot fungi in the family Fomitopsidaceae.

Taxonomy
Postia was circumscribed by mycologist Elias Magnus Fries in his 1874 work Hymenomycetes europaei. The genus name honours Swedish naturalist Hampus von Post (1822–1911).

Species
A 2008 estimate placed 30 species in the genus. , Index Fungorum accepts 57 species of Postia:

In a 2018 revision of the Postia caesia complex, Otto Miettinen and colleagues proposed four new combinations, and described ten new species:
P. alni Niemelä & Vampola (2018) – Europe
P. arbuti Spirin (2018) – North America
P. auricoma Spirin & Niemelä (2018 – Eurasia
P. bifaria Spirin (2018) – East Asia
P. caesiosimulans (G.F.Atk.) Spirin & Miettinen (2018) – Holarctic
P. comata Miettinen (2018) – Northeastern United States
P. cyanescens  Miettinen (2018) – Europe
P. glauca Spirin & Miettinen (2018) – East Asia
P. gossypina (Moug. & Lév.) Spirin & Rivoire (2018) – Europe
P. livens Miettinen & Vlasák (2018) – North America
P. magna  Miettinen (2018) – China; South Korea
P. populi  Miettinen (2018) – Holarctic
P. simulans (P.Karst.) Spirin & Rivoire (2018) – Holarctic
P. subviridis (Ryvarden & Guzmán) Spirin  (2018) – Europe; North America
P. yanae Miettinen & Kotiranta (2018) – Eastern Siberia

References

Fomitopsidaceae
Polyporales genera
Taxa named by Elias Magnus Fries
Taxa described in 1874